Rogelio Tapia Costa (10 July 1903 – 10 January 1986) was a Spanish footballer who played as a forward. He is the third top scorer of Celta Vigo, with 119 goals, an amount only surpassed by Moncho Polo and Manuel Copena "Nolete".  Rogelio played for the Real Club Fortuna de Vigo since childhood, appearing in the Vigo club's lineup in 1925, only to be crowned champion with the Galician club Balaídos.

Rogelio holds the record for the player with the most goals in a single game, scoring eight goals on 17 January 1926 in a 15–0 victory over Sporting Union.

Rogelio played with Celta for seven seasons. During those seasons Celta amassed 582 goals, 119 of which were scored by Rogelio.

Rogelio starred in a friendly match that the Galician team played in Estadio Riazor on 28 July 1929 against the Center of Spain team. The match ended up tied 0-0, as Rogelio could not hit any goals.

Rogelio's best year was the 1926–27 campaign, in which he scored 36 goals in 23 matches. He scored 119 goals in 113 official matches with Celta, averaging 1.05 goals per match. He left Real Club Celta in 1932, but still played one season in Union Sporting C. de Lavadores.  The record lives on in Celta's history soccer player with the best goal-scoring average, scoring one goal every 85 minutes.

References

External links
 

1903 births
1986 deaths
Spanish footballers
Footballers from Galicia (Spain)
Association football forwards
RC Celta de Vigo players